The 2015–16 Middle Tennessee Blue Raiders women's basketball team represented Middle Tennessee State University during the 2015–16 NCAA Division I women's basketball season. The Blue Raiders, led by eleventh year head coach Rick Insell, play their home games at the Murphy Center and were second year members of Conference USA. They finished the season 24–9, 15–3 in C-USA play to finish in a tie for second place. They won the Conference USA Women's Tournament and received an automatic bid to the NCAA women's basketball tournament where they lost in the first round to Florida State.

Roster

Rankings

Schedule

|-
! colspan="9" style="background:#00407A; color:#FFFFFF;"| Exhibition

|-
! colspan="9" style="background:#00407A; color:#FFFFFF;"| Non-conference regular season

|-
! colspan="9" style="background:#00407A; color:#FFFFFF;"| Conference USA regular season

|-
! colspan="9" style="background:#00407A; color:#FFFFFF;"| Conference USA Women's Tournament

|-
! colspan="9" style="background:#00407A; color:#FFFFFF;"| NCAA Women's Tournament

See also
2015–16 Middle Tennessee Blue Raiders men's basketball team

References

Middle Tennessee Blue Raiders women's basketball seasons
Middle Tennessee
Middle Tennessee
Middle Tennessee Blue Raiders
Middle Tennessee Blue Raiders